Manfred Müller may refer to:
 Manfred Müller (bishop), German Roman Catholic bishop
 Manfred Müller (footballer), German footballer